Esteem is the debut studio album from Australian synthpop band Machinations. The album was released in April 1983 on White Label Records, a subsidiary of Mushroom Records.

History
In late 1980, Machinations recorded some songs at Trafalgar Studios in November 1980, the band entered the studio with producer Lobby Loyde. These recordings resulted in the band's debut single, "Average Inadequacy"/"Arabia" in September 1981, and the four-track debut self-titled, Machinations EP, in December, both released on the independent Phantom Records label.

"Average Inadequacy" created enough interest for Mushroom's White Label to sign the band and reissue the single with a new B-side, "Machinations of Dance" in March 1982. A year later, Machinations issued a new single, "Jack"/"Be Double" in February 1983, prior to their debut album release, but it failed to chart. Esteem peaked at #54 on the Australian album charts. It was also released in the United States by A&M Records. Musically, the album contained synthpop with dark overtones, except for the single "Pressure Sway", a bright funk/pop song that was a dance-floor favourite.

Reception
Cash Box magazine said "In the disquieting-but-danceable style of Tears for Fears and Depeche Mode, Australian quartet Machinations make rhythmic music with sinister overtones. The emphasis here is on extended cuts with oblique lyrics, creating a sustained, almost hypnotic mood. Vocalist Fred Loneragan has a limited range, but uses what he has effectively to express alienated sentiments."

Singles
The first single, "Jack" was about US writer Jack Kerouac, and due to lyrical reference to illegal drugs ('I wanna take some 1960s LSD'), "Jack" was often not played in live sets when audiences included minors.

The second single off the album, "Pressure Sway", was released in April 1983 and reached #21 on the Australian singles charts during July 1983. It was released as both a 7" and 12" version. "Pressure Sway" also made an impact in the United States reaching #40 on Billboard's Club Play Singles chart.

Track listing
All songs written by Doyle, Loneragan, Starr, Swan.

Australian release

American release

Charts

Certifications

Personnel
 Tim Doyle — guitar
 Fred Loneragan — vocals
 Tony Starr — keyboards
 Nick Swan — bass guitar

References

1983 debut albums
Machinations (band) albums
Mushroom Records albums